Mostogradnja (Građevinsko preduzeće Mostogradnja a.d. Beograd) is a Serbian bridge building company, with headquarters in Belgrade, Serbia. Its projects have included bridges and interchanges, as well as industrial and military structures in Serbia, former Yugoslavia and abroad.

History
In 1945, a group of engineers, technicians and workers at the Directorate of the Yugoslav Railways was given the task to reconstruct the railway bridge at Pančevo over Tamiš which was destroyed during World War II. In 1946 and 1947, the group was expanded and given additional responsibility to reconstruct the bridges over Tisa at Titel and over Danube at Bogojevo.

In July 1947, the Directorate of Yugoslav Railways established Mostogradnja Railway Civil Engineering Enterprise, to specialize in bridge construction. The headquarters of the company, which were formerly situated at various sites of large projects, were finally moved from Titel to Belgrade in early 1949.

In 1952, Mostogradnja separated from the public railway company and became an independent enterprise. During the 1950s, Mostogradnja was expanded with the addition of the public railways' Enterprise For Repair of Construction Machines at Batajnica in 1955, and Pionir, another bridge construction enterprise from Belgrade in 1959.

In the 1970s and 1980s, Mostogradnja completed a series of major construction projects in Yugoslavia and abroad. The projects at home included the Gazela bridge and Mostar and Autokomanda interchanges, several bridges over Danube, and the bridge connecting the island of Krk to the Croatian mainland, which at the time of construction featured the longest concrete arch in the world. Abroad, the company constructed bridges, hangars, reservoirs, aerials and various industrial and military structures in Europe, Asia and Africa. These included a series of bridges over Tigris and Euphrates in Iraq.

By the early 1980s, Mostogradnja had 5,000 employees and was among world's top 250 construction companies. The decline of Yugoslavia and consequent United Nations trade embargo on Serbia in the 1990s reduced the company's market, but it continued to build domestic projects, including the bridges over Sava at Obrenovac and Ostružnica. The previously socially owned enterprise was privatized and became a joint stock company.

Company's recent projects have included the reconstruction of bridges destroyed by NATO during Kosovo war in 1999, as well as the repairs to numerous bridges across Serbia.

The Government of Serbia tried several times to sell its majority stake in company's ownership, but public auctions failed in 2009 and 2015. However, the Government still have plans to sell its ownership share in the company by 2020.

Projects
Road and railway bridge over Danube Novi Sad, 1957–1961
Grlo, ("throat"), road bridge over Morača river, 1962–1964
Road bridge over Euphrates at Fallujah, Iraq, 1964–1967
Gazela, road bridge over Sava in Belgrade, 1966–1971
Mala Rijeka Viaduct, tallest railway viaduct in the world, 20 km north of Podgorica, Montenegro, 1969-1973
Road bridge over Danube on the Smederevo-Kovin road, 1973–1976
Road bridge over Danube at Bogojevo, 1977–1980
Road bridge over Shat Al Hillah near Al Hillah, Iraq, 1974–1976
Road bridge over Euphrates at Mussayib, Iraq, 1974–1976
Road bridge over Tigris near Numaniyah, Iraq, 1975–1978
Krk bridge, connecting Croatian mainland to the island of Krk, 1976–1980
Road bridge over Boljetin on the Kladovo-Golubac road, 1984–1986
Road bridge over Gazivoda Lake, 1987–1989
Pedestrian bridge over Sava at Sremska Mitrovica, 1990–1992
30 bridges on a section of the Belgrade-Budapest motorway, near Subotica completed 1997
Road bridge over Sava at Ostružnica, 1990–1998
Road bridge over Lim in Priboj, 1997–1998
Road and heating pipeline bridge over Sava at Obrenovac, 1993–1999

References

External links
 
 Reference list at the company website
 Reconstruction of the road bridge at Ostružnica (in Serbian)

1947 establishments in Serbia
Companies based in Belgrade
Construction and civil engineering companies established in 1947
Construction and civil engineering companies of Serbia